Bauple is a rural town and locality in the Fraser Coast Region, Queensland, Australia. In the  the locality of Bauple had a population of 644 people.

Geography 
Bauple is principally flat farming land (elevation 50 metres). The locality contains the following mountains:

 Grassy Mountain in the south of the locality 
 Guyra Mountain in the west of the locality 
 Mount Bauple in the west of the locality 

The town is located centrally within the locality. The Bruce Highway passes through the location from south to north, bypassing the town to the east. The town is now accessed Bauple Drive, the former route of the Bruce Highway before the town was bypassed.

Sugarcane is the major crop in the area.

History 

The town was originally called Raby but the name was changed to Bauple on 20 November 1896, named after Mount Bauple. Bauple is believed to be derived from an Aboriginal word baupval in the Kabi language referring to a frilled lizard. In the Dreamtime, the spirit of the lizard guarded the sacred place on the mountain where stone axes were obtained.

In 1858 bauple nuts were discovered in Bauple; they are now known as macadamia nuts.

The Mount Bauple sugar mill was established in 1896; it was the largest in the district. It closed in 1951, as the sugarcane was then being sent to mills in Nambour and Maryborough.

Mount Bauple Provisional School opened on 7 February 1887. In 1888 it renamed Mount Bopple Provisional School. On 1 January 1909 it became Mount Bopple State School. It closed in September 1928 due to low student numbers. It reopened in March 1931, but and closed permanently on 10 February 1933.

Raby State School opened on 8 July 1901 with 58 students. It was renamed Bauple State School on 16 May 1935.

Rossendale State School  opened on 28 January 1919 and closed in 1962.

St Mark's Anglican Church was dedicated on 5 March 1926 by Archdeacon Glover. It closed circa 1979.

On Sunday 11 March 1928 Archbishop James Duhig officially opened and dedicated a Catholic church in Bauple. The timber church was built in the pointed Gothic style. The architect was P.O.E. Hawkes of Maryborough and the contractors were Walter Oscar Nielsen and Mr Jorgensen. The church subsequently closed and was privately owned. Later it was purchased for use as the Lighthouse Christian Church.

Bauple Uniting Church was dedicated and opened on 27 August 1996.

In the  Bauple had a population of 732 people.

In the  the locality of Bauple had a population of 644 people.

Education 
Bauple State School is a government primary (Prep-6) school for boys and girls at 44 Forestry Road. In 2017, the school had an enrolment of 47 students with 3 teachers (2 full-time equivalent) and 7 non-teaching staff (4 full-time equivalent). In 2018, the school had an enrolment of 36 students with 3 teachers (2 full-time equivalent) and 5 non-teaching staff (3 full-time equivalent).

There is no secondary school in Bauple. The nearest government secondary schools are Maryborough State High School in Maryborough to the north-east and James Nash State High School in Gympie to the south.

Amenities 
Bauple Uniting Church is at 17 Main Street.

Lighthouse Christian Church is at 20-22 Main Street. The church building was formerly a Catholic church.

Bauple Recreation Reserve is on the corner of Mackellar Street and Forestry Road. It has sports fields, a playground and an undercover stage for performances.

Brian Talman Park is on Darwin Road. It has barbeque and picnic facilities.

Bauple Rural Fire Station is on the corner of Slottenvale Road and Mill Street.

Attractions 

The Mount Bauple Museum is operated by the Mount Bauple and District Historical Society. One exhibit is a crocodile skin from a crocodile found in the Mary River near Owanyilla in 1964. The society have also restored a 1907 Fowler-built locomotive used at the Isis Sugar Mill, similar to one used at the Mount Bauple mill.

There is a self-guided heritage trail through the town passing 24 historic sites.

Events 
The Bauple Nut Bash is held annually in the Bauple Recreation Grounds.

Notable people
Notable people who come from or have resided in Bauple include:
 Charles Trussell, brass band composer

References

Further reading

External links

 
 

Towns in Queensland
Fraser Coast Region
Localities in Queensland